This is a list of native New Zealand ferns.
These are the true ferns in the Division Pteridophyta that are native to New Zealand.
The ferns of Alsophila, Sphaeropteris and Dicksonia are tree ferns that can grow quite high, all the other genus groups are that of ground, climbing or perching ferns.

Aspleniaceae

There are over 700 species in the genus Asplenium, the spleenworts. Around 20 are native to New Zealand, with A. aethiopicum naturalized since 2003.
Asplenium appendiculatum – Ground spleenwort, Coastal spleenwort
Asplenium bulbiferum – Hen and Chickens fern, mouku, manamana
Asplenium chathamense
Asplenium cimmeriorum
Asplenium flabellifolium – Butterfly fern, Necklace fern
Asplenium flaccidum – Hanging spleenwort, raukatauri
Asplenium gracillimum
Asplenium haurakiense – Hauraki Gulf spleenwort
Asplenium hookerianum – Hooker's spleenwort
Asplenium lamprophyllum
Asplenium lyallii – Lyall's spleenwort
Asplenium northlandicum – Northern shore spleenwort
Asplenium oblongifolium – Shining spleenwort, huruhuruwhenua
Asplenium obtusatum – Shore spleenwort, paranako, parenako
Asplenium pauperequitum – Poor Knights spleenwort
Asplenium polyodon – Sickle spleenwort, petako
Asplenium richardii – Richard's spleenwort, matua-kaponga
Asplenium scleroprium (A. aucklandicum)
Asplenium shuttleworthianum
Asplenium subglandulosum – Blanket fern
Asplenium trichomanes – Maidenhair spleenwort

Blechnaceae
Austroblechnum colensoi – Waterfall fern, Colenso's hard fern
Austroblechnum lanceolatum – Lance water fern
Austroblechnum penna-marina – Alpine water fern
Cranfillia fluviatilis – Creek fern, kiwikiwi
Diploblechnum fraseri – Miniature tree fern
Doodia media – Rasp fern
Icarus filiformis – Thread fern
Lomaria discolor – Crown fern
Parablechnum novae-zelandiae –  Palm-Leaf fern, kio kio
Parablechnum procerum –  Mountain kiokio

Cyatheaceae
Alsophila colensoi – Mountain tree fern
Alsophila cunninghamii – Gully tree fern, Slender tree fern or Ponga
Alsophila dealbata – Silver tree fern, Silver fern, Kaponga or Ponga
Alsophila kermadecensis – Kermadec tree fern (Kermadec Islands)
Alsophila milnei – Milnes tree fern (Kermadec Islands)
Alsophila smithii – Soft tree fern, Katote
Sphaeropteris medullaris – Black tree fern, Mamaku

Dennstaedtiaceae
Histiopteris incisa – Water Fern
Hypolepis ambigua – Pig Fern
Hypolepis millefolium – Thousand-Leaved Fern
 Leptolepia novae-zelandiae – Lace Fern
Paesia scaberula – Ring Fern
Pteridium esculentum – Bracken

Dicksoniaceae
Dicksonia squarrosa – wheki, rough tree fern,
Dicksonia fibrosa – wheki-ponga
Dicksonia lanata – tūōkura

Dryopteridaceae
Lastreopsis glabella
Lastreopsis hispida – Hairy fern
Polystichum richardii – Common shield fern
Polystichum vestitum – Prickly shield fern
Rumohra adiantiformis – climbing shield fern

Gleicheniaceae
Diranopteris linearis
Gleichenia dicarpa – Tangle fern, spider fern, swamp umbrella fern
Gleichenia circinnata – Tangle fern, spider fern, swamp umbrella fern
Gleichenia microphylla – Carrier tangle, parasol fern, waewaekākā
Sticherus cunninghamii – Umbrella fern, tapuwae kōtuku, waekura
Sticherus flabellatus
Sticherus tener

Grammitidaceae
Ctenopteris herterphylla – Comb fern, Gypsy Fern
Grammitis billardierei – Common strap fern
Grammitis ciliata
Grammitis gunnii
Grammitis magellanica
Grammitis patagonica
Grammitis pseudociliata
Grammitis rawlingsii
Grammitis ridida

Hymenophyllaceae
Hymenopyllum armstrongii
Hymenopyllum atrovirens
Hymenophyllum bivalve
Hymenophyllum cupressiforme
Hymenopyllum demissum – Drooping filmy fern, irirangi, piripiri
Hymenopyllum dilatatum – Matua, mauku
Hymenopyllum ferrugineum – Rusty filmy fern
Hymenophyllum flabellatum – Fan-like filmy fern
Hymenophyllum flexuosum
Hymenophyllum lyallii
Hymenophyllum malingii
Hymenophyllum minimum
Hymenophyllum multifidum – Much-divided filmy fern
Hymenophyllum nephrophyllum – kidney fern, konehu, kopakapa, raurenga
Hymenophyllum peltatum – One-sided filmy fern
Hymenophyllum pulcherrimun – Tufted filmy fern
Hymenophyllum rarum
Hymenophyllum revolutum
Hymenophyllum rufescens
Hymenophyllum sanguinolentum – Piripiri
Hymenophyllum scabrum – Rough filmy fern
Hymenophyllum villosum – Hairy filmy fern
Trichomanes colensoi
Trichomanes elongatum – Bristle fern
Trichomanes endlicherianum
Trichomanes venosum

Marattiaceae
Ptisana salicina – King fern, horseshoe fern, para

Osmundaceae
Leptopteris hymenophylloides – Single crepe fern, heruheru
Leptopteris superba – Crepe fern, Prince of Wales feathers, heruheru, ngātukākariki, ngutungutu kiwi
Osmunda regalis – Royal fern
Todea barbara – Hard todea

Ophioglossaceae
Botrychium australe – Parsley fern, patotara
Botrychium biforme – Fine-leaved parsley fern
Botrychium lunaria – Moonwort
Ophioglossum coriaceum – Adder's tongue
Ophioglossum petiolatum – Stalked adder tongue

Polypodiaceae
Dendroconche scandens – Fragrant fern, mokimoki
Loxogramme dictyopteris – Lance fern
Microsorum pustulatum – Hounds tongue fern, kōwaowao, pāraharaha
Microsorum novae-zealandiae
Polypodium vulgare – Common polypody
Pyrrosia eleagnifolia – Leather-leaf fern

Pteridaceae
Adiantum aethiopicum – True maidenhair, mākaka
Adiantum capillus-veneris – European maidenhair, venus-hair fern
Adiantum cunninghamii – Common maidenhair, Cunningham's maidenhair
Adiantum diaphanum – Small maidenhair
Adiantum formosum – Giant maidenhair, plumed maidenhair
Adiantum fulvum
Adiantum hispidulum – Rosy maidenhair
Adiantum Raddianum
Adiantum viridescens
Anogramma leptophylla – Annual fern, Jersey fern
Cheilanthes distans – Woolly cloak fern, woolly rock fern
Cheilanthes sieberi – Rock fern
Pellaea calidirupium
Pellaea falcata
Pellaea rotundifolia – Button fern, round-leaved fern, tarawera

Pteris comans – Coastal brake, netted brake
Pteris cretica – Cretan brake

Pteris macilenta – Sweet fern
Pteris saxatilis – Carse
Pteris tremula – Shaking brake, tender brake, turawera

Pneumatopteris pennigera – Gully fern

Schizaeaceae
Lygodium articulatum – Bushman's mattress, makamaka, mangemange
Schizaea australis – Southern comb fern
Schizaea dichotoma – Fan fern
Schizaea fistulosa – Comb fern

See also
 List of native New Zealand fern allies
 Flora of New Zealand

References

 Brownsey, P. and Smith-Dodsworth, J (2000) New Zealand ferns and allied plants, Auckland, David Bateman Ltd.
 Landcare Research: Ngā Tipu o Aotearoa—New Zealand Plants

 
Native New Zealand ferns
New Zealand Ferns
.New Zealand